In the Scottish Parliament, the Leader of the Opposition (more formally, the Leader of the Opposition in the Scottish Parliament) is an unofficial title held by the leader of the largest political party in the Scottish Parliament that is not in government. The role has also been referred to as the Shadow First Minister.

Unlike in the Parliament at Westminster where there is an Official Opposition to the government of the day, all parties in the Scottish Parliament that are not in government are all technically on the same footing as 'opposition parties'.

Since May 2021, this has been Douglas Ross  of the Scottish Conservatives, who succeeded Ruth Davidson.

To date the office has been held by 13 
individuals, three from the Scottish National Party, seven from the Scottish Labour Party and three from the Scottish Conservative Party.

List of leaders of the opposition in the Scottish Parliament

See also
 First Minister of Scotland
 Deputy First Minister of Scotland
 Opposition Parties of the Scottish Parliament
 Scottish Parliament
 Scottish Government

References

Scottish Parliament
Scotland